Maroun Ammar (born 10 February 1956 in Hajjéh, Lebanon) is Bishop of the Maronite Catholic Eparchy of Sidon (Saida).

Life

Maroun Ammar received on 17 September 1983 his priestly ordination. 

Pope Benedict XVI confirmed his appointment as auxiliary bishop of the Maronite Catholic Eparchy of Joubbé, Sarba and Jounieh to Joubbé and as Titular Bishop of Canatha on 16 June 2012. Maronite Patriarch of Antioch, Cardinal Bechara Boutros al-Rahi, OMM ordained him on 28 July of the same year to the episcopate. His co-consecrators were Samir Mazloum, retired Curial Bishop of Antioch, Guy-Paul Noujaim, Emeritus Curia Bishop in Joubbé, Sarba and Jounieh, Paul Youssef Matar, Archeparch of Beirut, Francis Némé Baïssari, Emeritus Auxiliary Bishop in Joubbé, Sarba and Jounieh, Paul Nabil El-Sayah, Curial Bishop of Antioch, Joseph Mohsen Béchara, Emeritus Archeparch of Antelias, Simon Atallah, OAM, Bishop of Baalbek-Deir El-Ahmar, François Eid, OMM, procurator of the Maronite Patriarch at the Holy See, Edgard Madi, Eparch of Nossa Senhora do Líbano em São Paulo, and Michel Aoun, Bishop of Byblos.

In June 2017, he was appointed as Bishop of Saida (Sidon) and again consecrated by Cardinal al-Rahi. His principal co-consecrators were Edgard Madi, Maronite Bishop of São Paulo  and Chucrallah-Nabil El-Hage, Archeparch of Tyre, who is also from Hajjéh.

In December 2020, Ammar and the retired el-Hage were co-consecrators when Charbel Abdallah  - who is also from Hajjéh - was consecrated by al-Rahi as el-Hage's successor in Tyre.

References

External links
 http://www.catholic-hierarchy.org/bishop/bammar.html

1956 births
Lebanese Maronites
Living people
21st-century Maronite Catholic bishops
Eastern Catholic bishops in Lebanon